The Barrows Bearhawk Patrol is a two-seat aircraft, that was designed to meet United States homebuilt aircraft category requirements. It was developed from the four-seat Barrows Bearhawk.

A development of the Patrol is the Bearhawk Companion, a two seat in side-by-side configuration variant.

Design and development
The Bearhawk Patrol is designed to improve on the Piper Super Cub. It is a single engine, strut-braced, high-wing, tandem seat aircraft with conventional landing gear or floats. The fuselage is constructed with welded steel tubing with aircraft fabric covering. The wing spars and ribs are aluminum with aluminum covering. The flaps deploy up to 40 degrees.

Specifications (Bearhawk Patrol)

See also

References

Homebuilt aircraft
Bearhawk Patrol
Single-engined tractor aircraft
High-wing aircraft